Angella Emurwon is a Ugandan playwright. She won the 2012 International Playwriting Competition first prize in the English as a Second Language category for her play Sunflowers Behind A Dirty Fence, in the 23rd International Playwriting Competition held by the BBC World Service and the British Council, in partnership with Commonwealth Writers. Her play The Cow Needs A Wife came third in the 2010 BBC African Performance Play Writing Competition.

Bibliography

Plays
Sunflowers Behind A Dirty Fence, 2012
The Cow Needs A Wife, 2010

Short stories
"Love puzzle"

References

External links 
"Ugandan playwright wins BBC World Service writing competition"
"Angella Emurwon: Playwright with a rising international profile"
"Ugandans sweep BBC awards" 
"Writing Plays; What Is It?"
"Books They Read: Angella Emurwon"
"Angella Emurwon speaks on her global playwriting award" 
"Censorship and the Arts in Uganda"
Angella Emurwon on Facebook
YouTube video on Angella Emurwon Part 1 - The challenges of having a social focus
https://hi-in.facebook.com/GoetheZentrumKampala/videos/sunday-uganda-angella-emurwon-only-four-days-to-ngalabi-short-film-festival-2019/279933316020517/

Living people
Ugandan women writers
Ugandan dramatists and playwrights
Year of birth missing (living people)
Place of birth missing (living people)
21st-century Ugandan women writers
21st-century dramatists and playwrights